An audit is an independent evaluation of an organization, process, project, product or system.

Audit, auditor or auditing may also refer to:

Types of audit
Academic audit, the completion of a course of study for which no assessment is completed or grade awarded
Conformity assessment audit (ISO, HACCP, JCAHCO)
Environmental audit
Energy audit
First Amendment audits, social movement involving photographing or filming from a public space
Financial audit, the examination by an independent third party of the financial statements of a company
Clinical audit, a process of the United Kingdom's National Health Service
Internal audit 
Performance audit, an examination of a program, function, operation or the management systems and procedures of a governmental or non-profit entity
Quality audit, a systematic, independent examination of a quality system

Helpdesk and incident reporting auditing

Computing
Audit (telecommunication) - multiple meanings
audit trail
Information technology security audit -  a process that can verify that certain standards have been met
Configuration audit (as part of configuration management)
Information technology audit - an examination of the controls within an entity's Information technology infrastructure
Software audit (disambiguation) - multiple meanings
Auditor Security Collection, a Linux distribution which was merged into BackTrack

Religion
Auditing (Scientology), a procedure in Scientology
Saint Auditor (Nectarius of Auvergne), Christian martyr of the 4th century

Other uses
 Auditor, the head of a Student Society, especially in Ireland
Auditors of Reality, characters in the Discworld novels

Auditing